Democratic rationalization is term used by Andrew Feenberg in his article "Subversive Rationalization: Technology, Power and Democracy with technology."  Feenberg argues against the idea of technological determinism citing flaws in its two fundamental theses. The first is the thesis of unilinear progress.  This is the belief that technological progress follows a direct and predictable path from lower to higher levels of complexity and that each stage along this path is necessary for progress to occur (Feenberg 211).

The second is the thesis of determination by the base.  This is the concept that  in a society where a technology had been introduced, that society must organize itself or adapt to the technology (Feenberg 211). In his argument against the former thesis Feenberg says that constructivist studies of technology will lead us to realize that there is not a set path by which development of technologies occur but rather an emerging of similar technologies at the same time leading to a multiplicity of choices.  These choices are made based upon certain social factors and upon examining them we will see that they are not deterministic in nature (Feenberg 212).

Arguing against the latter thesis, Feenberg calls to our attention social reforms that have been mandated by governments mainly in regards to the protection of its citizens and laborers.  Most of the time these mandates are widely accepted after being passed through the governing body. At which point technology and industry will reform and re-evolve to meet the new standards in a way that has greater efficiency than it did so previously (Feenberg 214)

Bibliography
Feenberg, Andrew. "Democratic Rationalization". Readings in the Philosophy of Technology. David M. Kaplan. Oxford: Rowman & Littlefield, 2004. 209-225

See also
Andrew Feenberg
Determinism
Hegemony
Compatibilism and incompatibilism
Sociocultural evolution
Techno-utopianism
Technological Determinism
Technological Fix
Technological Somnambulism

Science and technology studies
History of technology
Historical determinism
Technology in society